Ali Mohammadi may refer to:

 Ali Mohammadi, Iran, a village
 Ali Mohammadi (wrestler) (born 1984), Iranian Greco-Roman wrestler